This is a list of the National Register of Historic Places entries in Peekskill, New York. See also National Register of Historic Places listings in Westchester County, New York for all other listings in the county.

This is intended to be a complete list of properties and districts listed on the National Register of Historic Places in Peekskill, New York.  The locations of National Register properties and districts (at least for all showing latitude and longitude coordinates below) may be seen in an online map by clicking on "Map of all coordinates".



Current listings

|}

See also

National Register of Historic Places listings in New York
National Register of Historic Places listings in Westchester County, New York
National Register of Historic Places listings in northern Westchester County, New York

References

Peekskill, New York
Peekskill, New York
Peekskill, New York
Peekskill